Diarrheneae is a tribe of grasses, containing two genera.

References

Pooideae
Poaceae tribes